The Pavilion At Star Lake, (originally Coca-Cola Star Lake Amphitheater) is an outdoor amphitheater near Burgettstown, Pennsylvania, United States, 25 miles west of Pittsburgh. The venue holds approximately 23,000 fans: 7,100 in a reserved-seating, open-air pavilion and an additional 16,000 on a general-admission lawn. It is owned and operated by Live Nation.

The venue opened as Coca-Cola Star Lake Amphitheater and hosted its first national act, Billy Joel, on June 17, 1990. A second show was added on June 18, 1990 due to the record-breaking response. Since then, it has hosted many other "big-name" concerts. In 2000, the name of the venue was changed to the Post-Gazette Pavilion after the Pittsburgh Post-Gazette bought the naming rights. In February 2010, the publication announced it had not renewed its contract for naming rights to the facility. This led First Niagara Bank to snatch up the naming rights, after which the venue was named First Niagara Pavilion. The facility was renamed again in 2016, becoming KeyBank Pavilion after KeyCorp finished its acquisition of First Niagara. It was renamed S&T Bank Music Park in 2020.

Performer history
Janet Jackson was scheduled to perform at the amphitheater during her Rhythm Nation World Tour on September 3, 1990, but the show was canceled.

The Grateful Dead played the venue twice (June 22 and 23, 1992).

Metallica played the venue on August 12, 1994 as part of the Summer Sh*t Tour.

INXS played their final concert with former lead vocalist Michael Hutchence on September 27, 1997, less than two months before his death.

Lynyrd Skynyrd Recorded their 1998 live album Lyve From Steel Town the previous summer at Starlake Amphitheatre.

The British group the Spice Girls performed at the venue, as part of their Spiceworld Tour, on July 15, 1998.

Phish recorded their show on July 29, 2003, at the venue, later releasing it as a live album entitled Live Phish 07.29.03. They subsequently performed a sold-out show on June 18, 2009, and again on June 23, 2012. All told, Phish have performed 7 shows at the venue the first in 1997 and the most recent in 2012. The band's August 11, 1998 performance at the venue was released on the DVD Star Lake '98 in 2012.

Fleetwood Mac were scheduled to perform during their Say You Will Tour on June 10, 2004, but the show was canceled.

Josh Groban performed here in August 2004 during his "Closer" tour, as well as during August 2016 on his summer "Stages"/mix tour with Sarah McLachlan.

Kings of Leon were scheduled to perform during their Come Around Sundown World Tour on September 7, 2010, with The Whigs and The Black Keys as their opening acts, but the show was canceled, due to scheduling conflicts.

Jimmy Buffett & The Coral Reefer Band have performed at the venue nearly every year since it opened in 1990. The only exception is when they played PNC Park in 2005 and in 2017.  At the July 7, 2018, Son of A Son of A Sailor Tour concert, thousands of ParrotHeads were left waiting to get into the venue for hours.

Farm Aid has been played here twice. September 21, 2002, and September 17, 2017.

Dave Matthews Band has played the most shows at Star Lake with 32.

The venue has also played host to music festivals, including All That! Music and More Festival, Crüe Fest, Crüe Fest 2, Family Values Tour, Farm Aid, H.O.R.D.E. Festival, Honda Civic Tour, Identity Festival, Lilith Fair, Lollapalooza, Mayhem Festival, Ozzfest, Projekt Revolution, Uproar Festival, and Vans Warped Tour.

In popular culture
The venue was featured on a 2002 episode of The Daily Show.

In December 2012, Phish released a concert video, Star Lake 98, of their 1998 show at the venue during their summer tour.

Dave Matthews Band released Live Trax Vol. 35 on October 16, 2015, The show was recorded June 20, 2009. 
In May 2020 DMB also released Live Trax Vol. 51 from their August 10, 2007 show there.

Political visits
President George W. Bush visited the venue on November 1, 2004 along with Curt Schilling & Lynn Swann.

See also
List of contemporary amphitheatres
Live Nation

References

External links
The Pavilion at Star Lake - Official Site

Amphitheaters in the United States
Buildings and structures in Washington County, Pennsylvania
Music venues completed in 1990
1990 establishments in Pennsylvania
Music venues in Pittsburgh